North Side station may refer to:

 North Side station (Trinity Metro), a station in Fort Worth, Texas, USA
 North Side station (PAAC), a station in Pittsburgh, Pennsylvania, USA

See also
 Northside station, a station on the Metrorail rapid transit service in Miami-Dade County, Florida